Porto Mantovano is a town in the province of Mantua, Lombardy, Italy.

References

Cities and towns in Lombardy